Elizabeth Falkner (born February 12, 1966) is an American chef, pastry chef, author, restaurateur, and consulting chef. She has appeared as a competitor and sometimes a judge on reality television cooking competitions, and she is a Top Chef television series alum. She is currently residing and working in Los Angeles, California,

Early life and education 
Elizabeth Falker was born on February 12, 1966, in San Francisco, California, and raised in Southern California. Her father was an art professor. Falkner graduated from the San Francisco Art Institute in 1989 with a BFA degree.

Career 
Her first restaurant job was as a dishwasher at French bistro Cafe Claude in San Francisco. She moved into French fine dining at Masa's with Chef Julian Serrano. In 1993, Falkner became the pastry chef at Elka in the Miyako Hotel, and in 1994 Falkner was the pastry chef under chef Traci Des Jardins at Drew Nieporent's restaurant Rubicon.

Citizen Cake and Orson 
In 1997, Falkner opened Citizen Cake, a dessert cafe at its first location in the Mission District at 82-14th Street, San Francisco in a partnership with coffee roaster Bob Vorhees. It remained there until 2000 when she moved the restaurant to 399 Grove Street, in the Hayes Valley neighborhood. A second spinoff location of Citizen Cake was located in the Virgin Megastore on Market Street in San Francisco. From 2010 to 2011, Citizen Cake moved to 2125 Fillmore Street in Pacific Heights before closing.

The restaurant Orson was co-owned with partner Sabrina Riddle and opened in 2008 in SoMA at 508-4th Street, San Francisco. Orson took two years and cost 4 million dollars to build and was designed by the Zack/de Vito firm. However, in 2008, the same year as opening, there was a period of economic recession. Orson closed after approximately three years in October 2011.

New York City 
In 2011, Falkner closed both of her San Francisco establishments, Citizen Cake and Orson, and moved to New York, where she opened two short-lived Italian restaurants, Krescendo in Boerum Hill, Brooklyn from 2012 to July 2013; and Corvo Bianco on the Upper West Side from July 2013 to February 2014.

In 2012, Falkner won first prize at the World Pizza Championship in Naples, Italy, with her "Finocchio Flower Power" pizza from Krescendo.

Teaching and events 
From 2001 to 2002, Falkner taught professional pastry courses in Japan; and, from 2002 to 2003, she was the chef on a team doing research for American/European pastries for Barilla in Parma, Italy.

She has cooked at the James Beard House in New York City; the Masters of Food and Wine in Carmel, California; and the Chef's Holiday at the Ahwahnee Hotel in Yosemite National Park.

Television appearances 
She has appeared in The Next Iron Chef: Super Chefs (season 4, 2011, Food Network); and The Next Iron Chef: Redemption (2012, Food Network); Chopped All Stars (Food Network); Top Chef Masters; Top Chef; Top Chef: Just Desserts (Bravo); Top Chef: Canada; and Food Network Challenge (Food Network).

In 2005, Falkner competed on Iron Chef America, Tyler's Ultimate, $40 a Day, Sugar Rush, Best Of, Bay Cafe, Top Chef-Pastry and others. In 2006, Falkner appeared as a guest judge on Top Chef, a reality show on the Bravo network.  

In 2020, 2021, and 2022, Falkner competed on Guy Fieri's Tournament of Champions (Food Network) seasons 1, 2, and 3.

Personal life
Falkner identifies as lesbian. She is active in the LGBTQ community, and has done extensive work with Act Up and the Human Rights Campaign, receiving the Charles M. Holmes Award from the latter in 2005.

Awards
 "Rising Star Chef" (1995) by the San Francisco Chronicle
 "Pastry Chef of the Year" (1999) by San Francisco Magazine
 "Golden Bowl" for "Best Pastry Chef" (2003) by Women Chefs and Restaurateurs
 "Golden Bowl" for "Women Who Inspire" (2003) by Women Chefs and Restaurateurs
 "10 Women With Substance and Style" (2004) by Organic Style Magazine
 "Best Pastry Chef" nominee (2005) by the James Beard Foundation
 "Charles M. Holmes Award" (2005) by the Human Rights Campaign
 2012 World Pizza Championship, 1st Place, Naples Italy.
 2019 Blended Burger Battle, 1st Place, StarChefs, Brooklyn Expo, International Chefs Congress

Books

References

External links 
 
 
 Biography at Star Chefs

1966 births
Living people
American food writers
Food Network chefs
Lesbian entertainers
American LGBT entertainers
LGBT people from California
Pastry chefs
San Francisco Art Institute alumni
Women chefs
Women food writers
Writers from San Francisco
LGBT chefs
Chefs from San Francisco
Chefs from New York City
American women restaurateurs
American restaurateurs